Semafor is a theater in Prague, Czech Republic.

Semafor may also refer to:

Se-ma-for, a Polish animation studio
Semafor (website), an American news website

See also
 Semaphore (disambiguation)